Sai Deodhar is an Indian actress who has worked in popular television soap operas, such as Saara Akaash and Ek Ladki Anjaani Si. Recently, she has appeared in Kashi – Ab Na Rahe Tera Kagaz Kora on NDTV Imagine, where she played the role of a mother of a 6-year-old girl. 

Sai is also busy in shooting of an unnamed film to be produced by her husband Shakti Anand. She appeared in her first role as a child artist in a 1993 Marathi Movie - Lapandav, where she played a mischievous young sister of the protagonist, who kicks off comedy of errors that unfolds in the film.

Personal life
Deodhar's father, cinematographer Debu Deodhar, is a Marathi and her mother, director Shrabani Deodhar, is Bengali. Her father died in 2010. She went to Mumbai to make her career in modelling and eventually got the role in Saara Akaash. Later, she married her on-screen co-star, Shakti Anand of Saara Akaash in 2005. She gave birth to a baby girl in 2011.

Filmography

Shows

Films
Prahar as Chickoo
 Ghar Aunda as Madhuri Azgaonkar
 Mogra Phulaalaa as Shivangi
Lapandav as Chinni

Director
 D.A.T.E.
 Silent Ties
 Fathers Day To You (Pocket Films)
 Blood Relation
 When A Man Loves A Woman
 Badhai Ho
 Worship The Woman Within - International Women's Day Anthem"
 Jhooti Jhooti Batiyaan - music video
 (Un)Sanskari - short Film

Producer
 Mujhse Kuchh Kehti...Yeh Khamoshiyaan (2012-2013)- TV show on Star Plus
 Sata Lota Pan Sagla Khota (2015) - film
 D.A.T.E. (2018)
 The Sholay Girl (2019) 
 Blood Relation (2020)
 When A Man Loves A Woman - short film (2021)
 Badhai Ho (short film) (2021)
 Worship The Woman Withi - International Women's Day Anthem" (music video) (2021)
 Jhooti Jhooti Batiyaan - music video
 (Un)Sanskari - short film
 Sonyachi Pavla - TV show on Colors Marathi

References

External links
 

Living people
Actresses from Pune
Indian television actresses
Indian soap opera actresses
Indian film actresses
Actresses in Hindi television
Actresses in Marathi cinema
Bengali actresses
Marathi actors
Indian women film directors
Indian women television directors
Indian women film producers
Indian women television producers
21st-century Indian actresses
Year of birth missing (living people)